Solitary confinement is a form of imprisonment in which the inmate lives in a single cell with little or no meaningful contact with other people. A prison may enforce stricter measures to control contraband on a solitary prisoner and use additional security equipment in comparison to the general population. Solitary confinement is a punitive tool within the prison system to discipline or separate disruptive prison inmates who are security risks to other inmates, the prison staff, or the prison itself. However, solitary confinement is also used to protect inmates whose safety is threatened by other inmates by separating them from the general population.

In a 2017 review, "a robust scientific literature has established the negative psychological effects of solitary confinement", leading to "an emerging consensus among correctional as well as professional, mental health, legal, and human rights organizations to drastically limit the use of solitary confinement." The United Nations General Assembly Standard Minimum Rules for the Treatment of Prisoners were revised in 2015 to extend restrictions on solitary confinement exceeding 15 days.

History 

The practice of solitary confinement in the United States traces its origins back to the 19th century when Quakers in Pennsylvania used this method as a substitution for public punishments. Research surrounding the possible psychological and physiological effects of solitary confinement dates back to the 1830s. When the new prison discipline of separate confinement was introduced at the Eastern State Penitentiary as part of the "Pennsylvania" or separate system in Philadelphia in 1829, commentators attributed the high rates of mental breakdown to the system of isolating prisoners in their cells. Charles Dickens, who visited the Philadelphia Penitentiary during his travels to America, described the "slow and daily tampering with the mysteries of the brain to be immeasurably worse than any torture of the body". Prison records from the Denmark institute in 1870 to 1920 indicate that staff noticed inmates were exhibiting signs of mental illnesses while in isolation, revealing that the persistent problem has been around for decades.

In the twentieth century, Scandinavian countries such as Denmark have extensively used solitary confinement for prisoners in pretrial detention with the stated goal of preventing them from interfering in the investigation. Norwegian mass murderer Anders Breivik was held in solitary confinement, partly to protect him from other inmates. However, his complaint was partially upheld by the European Court of Human Rights in 2016.

The first comment by the Supreme Court of the United States about solitary confinement's effect on prisoner mental status was made in 1890 (In re Medley 134 U.S. 160). In it the court found that the use of solitary confinement produced reduced mental and physical capabilities.

The use of solitary confinement increased greatly during the COVID-19 pandemic in order to avoid spread of the virus in prisons.

Use 
The practice is used when a prisoner is considered dangerous to themselves or to others, is suspected of organizing or being engaged in illegal activities outside of the prison, or, as in the case of a prisoner such as a child molester or a witness, is at a high risk of being harmed by other inmates. The latter example is a form of protective custody. Solitary confinement is also commonly used as a form of punishment for violation of prison rules or other disciplinary infractions by an inmate. Solitary confinement is the norm in supermax prisons, where prisoners who are deemed dangerous or of high risk are held.

By country or region

Europe
Solitary confinement as a disciplinary measure for prisoners in Europe was largely reduced or eliminated during the twentieth century. However, solitary confinement is still widely used across Europe for a variety of reasons.

The European Court of Human Rights distinguishes between complete sensory isolation, total social isolation and relative social isolation and notes that "complete sensory isolation, coupled with total social isolation can destroy the personality and constitutes a form of inhuman treatment which cannot be justified by the requirements of security or any other reason. On the other hand, the prohibition of contacts with other prisoners for security, disciplinary or protective reasons does not in itself amount to inhuman treatment or punishment."

The European Committee for the Prevention of Torture and Inhuman or Degrading Treatment or Punishment, or CPT, defines solitary confinement as "whenever a prisoner is ordered to be held separately from other prisoners, for example, as a result of court decision, as a disciplinary sanction imposed within the prison system, as a preventive administrative measure or for the protection of the prisoner concerned". The CPT "considers that solitary confinement should only be imposed in exceptional circumstances, as a last resort and for the shortest possible time".

Italian prisoners subject to special surveillance ("41-bis regime") may be in de facto solitary confinement. A person sentenced to multiple life sentences in Italy may be required by the Minister of Justice to serve a period of between 6 months to years in the "41-bis regime" of solitary confinement, subject to extension and review.

United Kingdom 

In 2015, segregation (solitary confinement) was used 7,889 times.<ref name= 54 out of 85,509 prisoners held in England and Wales in 2015 were placed in solitary confinement cells in Close Supervision Centres (Shalev & Edgar, 2015:149), England and Wales' version of the US 'Supermax'.

The use of solitary confinement on juveniles and children, as elsewhere, has been a subject of contention. Critics argue that, in the United Kingdom, the state has a duty to "set the highest standards of care" when it limits the liberties of children. Frances Crook is one of many to believe that incarceration and solitary confinement are the harshest forms of possible punishments and "should only be taken as a last resort". Because children are still mentally developing, incarceration also should not encourage them to commit more violent crimes.

The penal system has been cited as failing to protect juveniles in custody. In the United Kingdom, 29 children died in penal custody between 1990 and 2006: "Some 41% of the children in custody were officially designated as being vulnerable". That is attributed to the fact that isolation and physical restraint are used as the first response to punish them for simple rule infractions. Moreover, Frances Crook argues that these punitive policies not only violate their basic rights but also leave the children mentally unstable and left with illnesses that are often ignored. Overall, the solitary confinement of youth is considered to be counterproductive because the “restrictive environment... and intense regulation of children” aggravates them, instead of addressing the issue of rehabilitation.

Solitary confinement is colloquially referred to in British English as "the block", "The Segregation Unit" or "the cooler".

United States 

Solitary confinement first arose in the United States in the 1700s among religious groups like the Quakers, who thought isolation with a Bible would lead to repentance and rehabilitation.

In the United States penal system, more than 20 percent of state and federal prison inmates and 18 percent of local jail inmates are kept in solitary confinement or another form of restrictive housing at some point during their imprisonment. Between 41,000-48,000 people were held in solitary confinement in 2001 in the United States, according to a study by Yale Law School. Of this number, 6,000 were being held in solitary confinement for over a year. The period of confinement can last from a few days to several decades. According to Homer Venters, former Chief Medical Officer for the New York City jail system, "Solitary confinement is utilised for tens of thousands of people for years at a time.” Many of these people will be held in a Supermax prison- high-tech prisons purposely designed to hold people in strict and prolonged solitary confinement.

As of 2021, there have been attempts in New York State to ban the use of solitary confinement for periods of more than 15 days, in line with UN recommendations against the use of torture.

Venezuela 

The headquarters for the Bolivarian Intelligence Service (SEBIN) in Plaza Venezuela, Caracas, have an underground detention facility that has been dubbed La Tumba (The Tomb). The facility is located at the place that the underground parking for the Metro Caracas was to be located. The cells are two by three meters that have a cement bed, white walls, security cameras, no windows, and barred doors, with cells aligned next to one another so that there is no interaction between prisoners. Such conditions have caused prisoners to become very ill, but they are denied medical treatment. Bright lights in the cells are kept on so that prisoners lose their sense of time, with the only sounds heard being from the nearby Caracas Metro trains. Those who visit the prisoners are subjected to strip searches by multiple SEBIN personnel.

Allegations of torture in La Tumba, specifically white torture, are also common, with some prisoners attempting to commit suicide. Those conditions according to the NGO Justice and Process are intended to make prisoners plead guilty to the crimes that they are accused of.

Effects

Psychiatric 

Physicians have concluded that for those inmates who enter the prison already diagnosed with a mental illness, the punishment of solitary confinement is extremely dangerous in that the inmates are more susceptible to exacerbating the symptoms. Research indicates that the psychological effects of solitary confinement may encompass "anxiety, depression, anger, cognitive disturbances, perceptual distortions, obsessive thoughts, paranoia, and psychosis." A main issue with isolating prisoners who are known to have mental illnesses is that it prevents the inmates from ever possibly recovering. Instead, many "mentally ill prisoners decompensate in isolation, requiring crisis care or psychiatric hospitalization." It is also noted that if a prisoner is restrained from interacting with the individuals they wish to have contact with they exhibit similar effects.

The lack of human contact, and the sensory deprivation that often go with solitary confinement  can have a severe negative impact on a prisoner's mental state that may lead to certain mental illnesses such as depression, permanent or semi-permanent changes to brain physiology, an existential crisis, and death.

A 2013 systematic review published in Acta Psychiatrica Scandinavica concluded that solitary confinement was "associated with negative effects on mental health."

Self-harm

According to a March 2014 article in American Journal of Public Health, "Inmates in jails and prisons attempt to harm themselves in many ways, resulting in outcomes ranging from trivial to fatal."

Self-harm was seven times higher among the inmates where seven percent of the jail population was confined in isolation. Fifty-three percent of all acts of self-harm took place in jail. "Self-harm" included, but was not limited to, cutting, banging heads, self-amputations of fingers or testicles. These inmates were in bare cells, and were prone to jumping off their beds head first into the floor or even biting through their veins in their wrists. A main issue within the prison system and solitary confinement is the high number of inmates who turn to self-harm.

One study has shown that "inmates ever assigned to solitary confinement were 3.2 times as likely to commit an act of self-harm per 1,000 days at some time during their incarceration as those never assigned to solitary. These inmates assigned to solitary were 2.1 times as likely to commit acts of self-harm during the days that they were actually in solitary confinement and 6.6 times as likely to commit acts of self-harm during the days that they were not in solitary confinement, relative to inmates never assigned to solitary confinement." The study has concluded that there is a direct correlation between inmates who self-harm and inmates that are punished into solitary confinement. 
Many of the inmates look to self-harm as a way to "avoid the rigors of solitary confinement." Mental health professionals ran a series of tests that ultimately concluded that "self-harm and potentially fatal self-harm associated with solitary confinement was higher independent of mental illness status and age group."

Physical
Solitary confinement has been reported to cause hypertension, headaches and migraines, profuse sweating, dizziness, and heart palpitations. Many inmates also experience extreme weight loss due to digestion complications and abdominal pain. Many of these symptoms are due to the intense anxiety and sensory deprivation. Inmates can also experience neck and back pain and muscle stiffness due to long periods of little to no physical activity. These symptoms often worsen with repeated visits to solitary confinement.

Social
Some sociologists argue that prisons create a unique social environment that do not allow inmates to create strong social ties outside or inside of prison life. Men are more likely to become frustrated, and therefore more mentally unstable when keeping up with family outside of prisons. Extreme forms of solitary confinement and isolation can affect the larger society as a whole. The resocialization of newly released inmates who spent an unreasonable amount of time in solitary confinement and thus suffer from serious mental illnesses is a huge dilemma for society to face. The effects of isolation unfortunately do not stop once the inmate has been released. After release from segregated housing, psychological effects have the ability to sabotage a prisoner's potential to successfully return to the community and adjust back to ‘normal’ life. The inmates are often startled easily, and avoid crowds and public places. They seek out confined small spaces because the public areas overwhelm their sensory stimulation.

Criticism

Ineffectiveness
In 2002, the Commission on Safety and Abuse in America, chaired by John Joseph Gibbons and Nicholas Katzenbach found that: "The increasing use of high-security segregation is counter-productive, often causing violence inside facilities and contributing to recidivism after release."

Torture
Solitary confinement is considered to be a form of psychological torture with measurable long-term physiological effects when the period of confinement is longer than a few weeks or is continued indefinitely. In October 2011, UN Special Rapporteur on torture, Juan E. Méndez, told the General Assembly's third committee, which deals with social, humanitarian, and cultural affairs, that the practice could amount to torture: "Considering the severe mental pain or suffering solitary confinement may cause, it can amount to torture or cruel, inhuman or degrading treatment or punishment when used as a punishment, during pre-trial detention, indefinitely or for a prolonged period, for persons with mental disabilities or juveniles." In November 2014. the United Nations Committee Against Torture stated that full isolation for 22–23 hours a day in super-maximum security prisons is unacceptable. The United Nations have also banned the use of solitary confinement for longer than 15 days.

The long-term psychological impacts of solitary confinement in South Africa, as well as deprivation and constraint torture techniques in prisons, were observed as analogous to those of post-traumatic stress disorder.

There is a scholarly consensus that solitary confinement is harmful, which has led to a growing movement to reduce or abolish the practice.

Political use
In immigration detention centers, reports have surfaced concerning its use against detainees in order to keep those knowledgeable about their rights away from other detainees. In the prison-industrial complex itself, reports of solitary confinement as punishment in work labor prisons have also summoned much criticism. One issue prison reform activists have fought against is the use of Security Housing Units (extreme forms of solitary confinement). They argue that they do not rehabilitate inmates but rather serve only to cause inmates psychological harm. Further reports of placing prisoners into solitary confinement based on sexual orientation, race and religion have been an ongoing but very contentious subject in the last century.

Access to healthcare
Research has shown that the routine features of prison can make huge demands on limited coping resources. After prison many ex-convicts with mental illness do not receive adequate treatment for their mental health issues, because health services turn them away. This is caused by restrictive policies or lack of resources for treating the formerly incarcerated individual. In a study focusing on women and adolescent men, those who had health insurance, received mental health services, or had a job were less likely to return to jail. However, very few of the 1,000 individuals in this study received support from mental health services.

Ethics
Treating mentally ill patients by sentencing them into solitary confinement has captured the attention of human rights experts who conclude that "solitary confinement may amount to cruel, inhuman, or degrading treatment" that violates rights specifically targeting cruel, inhuman treatment. Health care professionals and organizations recognize the fact that solitary confinement is not ethical, yet the segregating treatment fails to come to a halt. "Experience demonstrates that prisons can operate safely and securely without putting inmates with mental illness in typical conditions of segregation." Despite this and medical professionals' obligations, segregation policies have not changed because mental health clinics believe that "isolation is necessary for security reasons." In fact, many believe that it is ethical for physicians to help those in confinement but that the physicians should also be trying to stop the abuse. If they cannot do so they are expected to undertake public advocacy.

Legality

The legality of solitary confinement has been frequently challenged over the past sixty years as conceptions surrounding the practice have changed.  Much of the legal discussion concerning solitary confinement has centered on whether or not it constitutes torture or cruel and unusual punishment. While international law has generally begun to discourage solitary confinement's use in penal institutions, opponents of solitary confinement have been less successful at challenging it within the United States legal system.

UN Special Rapporteurs on Torture Manfred Nowak and Juan Méndez have "repeatedly unequivocally stated that prolonged solitary confinement is cruel, inhuman or degrading treatment, and may amount to torture", though their statements are not primary sources in international law. 

A 2005 law journal article argued America's detention system is far below the basic minimum standards for treatment of prisoners under international law and has caused an international human rights concern: "U.S. solitary confinement practices contravene international treaty law, violate established international norms, and do not represent sound foreign policy."

Opposition and protests

The 2013 California prisoner hunger strike saw approximately 29,000 prisoners protesting conditions. This statewide hunger strike reaching two-thirds of California's prisons began with the organizing of inmates at Pelican Bay State Prison. On 11 July 2011, prisoners at Pelican Bay State Prison began a hunger strike to "protest torturous conditions in the Security Housing Unit (SHU) there..." and to advocate for procedural and policy changes like the termination of the "debriefing process" which forces prisoners "to name themselves or others as gang members as a condition of access to food or release from isolation". More than 6,000 inmates throughout the California prison system stood in solidarity with these Pelican State Bay prisoners in 2011 by also refusing their food. Also in solidarity with the 2011 Pelican Bay prisoners on strike is the Bay Area coalition of grassroots organizations known as the Prisoner Hunger Strike Solidarity Coalition. This coalition has aided the prisoners in their strike by providing a legal support force for their negotiations with the California Department of Corrections and Rehabilitation (CDCR) and by creating and running a media based platform to raise support and awareness for the strikers and their demands among the general public.

Solitary confinement has served as a site of inspiration for protest-organizing against its use in and outside of prisons and conversely, as a response tactic for prisons to react to the protest-organizing of its prisoners. In March 2014, authorities at the Northwest Detention Center in Washington relegated multiple detainees to solitary confinement units after their participation in protests for the improvement of conditions within the facility and in solidarity with activist organizing against deportation escalations outside of the facility.

Alternatives and reform

Possible alternatives
Scrutiny of super-maximum security prisons and the institutionalization of solitary confinement is accompanied by suggestions for alternative methods. In July 2013 the New York City Department of Correction transferred more seriously mentally ill inmates to an internal facility, similar to a hospital psychiatric ward, for more intensive therapy. Those with less severe mental illness who break disciplinary rules are still restricted to solitary confinement, but with increased hours of therapy and a behavioral intervention program. 
 
A second alternative is to deal with long-term inmates by promoting familial and social relationships through the encouragement of visitations which may help boost morale. Familial counseling and support may be useful for inmates nearing the end of a long-term sentence that may otherwise exhibit signs of aggression, and prison rules and discipline should be clear, rational, and consistent, while inmates should be given objective goals to improve their situation.

In 2013 Maine reduced its then-full supermax solitary population by half and implemented "informal sanctions" of restricted privileges, rather than solitary as punishment for every infraction. A 2013 Vera Institute of Justice report praised Washington state's use of alternative discipline to solitary and careful review and transition process when inmates enter and leave solitary, which began as a voluntary reform by prison officials 15 years prior.

See also
 Prison#Control units
 Isolation to facilitate abuse
 Prison abolition movement
 Single-celling
Separate system
 Box (form of torture involving solitary confinement in an overheated room)
 List of abnormal behaviours in animals
 Solitary Watch
 Suicide watch

References

Bibliography 
 Birckhead, T. R. (2015). Children in isolation: The solitary confinement of youth. Wake Forest Law Review 50(1), 1-80.
 Shalev, S. & Edgar, K. (2015). Deep Custody: Segregation Units and Close Supervision Centres in England and Wales. London: Prison Reform Trust.
 Shalev, S. (2009). Supermax : controlling risk through solitary confinement. Cullompton, UK: Willan. ISBN 978-1-84392-409-8.

External links

6×9: A virtual experience of solitary confinement. The Guardian.

.SolitaryConfinement.org 

Forensic psychology
Penal imprisonment
Penology
Torture
Human rights by issue